Anweshanam is a 1972 Indian Malayalam-language mystery-thriller drama film, directed by J. Sasikumar. The film stars Prem Nazir, Sharada, Kaviyoor Ponnamma and Adoor Bhasi in the lead roles. The film had musical score by M. K. Arjunan.

Cast
Prem Nazir
Sharada
Kaviyoor Ponnamma
Adoor Bhasi
Jose Prakash
Sankaradi
Bahadoor
Sujatha
Vijayasree

Soundtrack
The music was composed by M. K. Arjunan and the lyrics were written by Sreekumaran Thampi.

References

External links
 

1972 films
1970s Malayalam-language films